Binho Marques (born October 29, 1962, in São Paulo) is a Brazilian politician, and was the Governor of Acre from 2006 to 2010, when the government was assumed by Tião Viana.   He is a member of the Workers' Party.

References

1962 births
Living people
Governors of Acre (state)
Vice Governors of Acre (state)
Workers' Party (Brazil) politicians
People from São Paulo

Federal University of Acre alumni